Sharp MZ character set is a character set is made by Sharp Corporation for Sharp MZ.

Character set

References 

Character sets